Enulius bifoveatus, the Mexican longtail snake,  is a species of snake of the family Colubridae. The species is found in Mexico.

References

Enulius
Endemic fauna of Mexico
Reptiles of Mexico
Reptiles described in 1967
Taxa named by Hobart Muir Smith